Bofarreira is a village in the northern part of the island of Boa Vista in the Cape Verde archipelago. The village is around 10 km east of the island capital of Sal Rei.

Gallery

See also
List of villages and settlements in Cape Verde

References

Villages and settlements in Boa Vista, Cape Verde